Kermia maculosa is a species of sea snail, a marine gastropod mollusk in the family Raphitomidae.

Description
The length of the shell varies between 5 mm and 6 mm; its diameter 2½ mm.

(Original description) The oblong-ovate shell is white, shining and sparsely blotched with dark chestnut-brown. It is longitudinally ribbed and transversely elevately striated. The whorls are convex. The aperture is less than one-half the length of the shell.

Distribution
This marine species occurs off the Philippines.

References

 Shasky D.R. (1997). Reinstatement of Kermia maculosa (Pease, 1862) (Gastropoda: Turridae). The Festivus. 29: 11-13

External links
 

maculosa
Gastropods described in 1863